The Wel  is a river in Poland. It flows out of the Great Dąbrowa and Little Dąbrowa lakes near Dąbrówno, following a course of 118 km first that goes southwest and then north. It is a tributary of the Drwęca river, ending at Bratian. Lidzbark Welski is the largest town on the Wel.

The river gives its name to the protected area called Wel Landscape Park.

Rivers of Poland
Rivers of Warmian-Masurian Voivodeship